Preah Monivong Bokor National Park is a national park in southern Cambodia's Kampot Province that was established in 1993 and covers . It is designated as an ASEAN Heritage Park.
It is located in the Dâmrei Mountains, forming the southeastern parts of the Cardamom Mountains. Most of the park is about 1,000 metres above sealevel and the highest peak is Phnom Bokor at 1,081 metres, also referred to as Bokor Mountain.

History 
The Dâmrei Mountains was formerly a Khmer Rouge controlled area, but in 1993, Preah Monivong National Park was inaugurated along with most other national parks in Cambodia. It is one of only two ASEAN Heritage Parks in the country.

Preah Monivong National Park is well known for the abandoned Bokor Hill Station, a remote settlement build by the French colonialists in 1921. They also built a Catholic church nearby in 1928, a very rare sight in Cambodia. The park is named after King Sisowath Monivong who used to visit the area and eventually died here in 1941. Monivong ordered the construction of a Buddhist temple in the area in 1924.

In recent times the national park has become a popular tourist destination and now includes Thansur Bokor Highland Resort, a large luxury hotel built in 2012. In 2010, a large statue of Lok Yeay Mao was constructed in the area. Lok Yeay Mao is a mythic heroine from Cambodian Buddhism and is said to protect travellers, hunters and fishing men. At 29 metres, it is the tallest Yeay Mao statue in the country.

In 2019, the government released a "Master Plan for Bokor City Development Project until 2035", by which 18,987 acres of the park are to be developed for residents, tourism, and businesses.

References

External links 

National parks of Cambodia
Cardamom Mountains
Geography of Kampot province
ASEAN heritage parks
1993 establishments in Cambodia
Protected areas established in 1993
Tourist attractions in Kampot province